Traian Popovici (October 17, 1892 – June 4, 1946) was a Romanian lawyer and mayor of Cernăuți during World War II, known for saving 20,000 Jews of Bukovina from deportation.

Life 
Popovici was born in Rușii Mănăstioarei village of the Duchy of Bukovina in the Austro-Hungarian Empire. He was the son of Andrei Popovich of Udești and grandson of Ioan Popovich, a famous priest, who, in 1777, refused to take the oath to the Austrian Empire.

He studied at the Suceava high school (1903–1911), then enrolled at the Faculty of Law of the University of Chernowitz, which he graduated at the end of World War I. He was a former president of Societatea Academică Junimea. In 1908, while a high school student, he crossed from Austria-Hungary into Romania illegally, in order to see Nicolae Iorga who was visiting the town of Burdujeni.  When World War I started, he went to Romania and enlisted in the Romanian Army, fighting until the end of the war.  After World War I, he settled briefly in Chișinău, where he was secretary at "Our House" organization that dealt with land reform.

In the interwar period, he worked as a lawyer in the city of Cernăuți. After the Soviet occupation of Northern Bukovina in June 1940, he took refuge in Bucharest, where he continued to work as a lawyer.

Mayor of Cernăuți
Military dictator Ion Antonescu requested him to become mayor of Cernăuți, but Popovici initially refused, unwilling to serve a fascist government. He changed his mind, however, based on advice from his friends. After long debates, Calotescu accepted his point of view. Due to Popovici's defense of Jews, his political adversaries nicknamed him "jidovitul" ("the turned-Jewish").

On August 30, 1941, Rioșanu died after an unsuccessful surgery, and he was succeeded as governor by General Corneliu Calotescu. On October 10, Calotescu announced his decision that all the Jews of Cernăuți must be deported to Transnistria. After talks with the governor, the latter agreed that Popovici would be allowed to nominate 200 Jews who were to be exempted. Unsatisfied with the modest concession, Popovici tried reaching Antonescu himself, this time arguing that Jews were of capital importance to Cernăuți's economy and requested a postponement until replacements could be found. As a result, he was allowed to expand the list, which covered 20,000 Jews in its final version.

Legacy

Popovici is honored by Israel's Yad Vashem memorial as one of the Righteous Among the Nations, an honour given to non-Jews who behaved with heroism in trying to save Jews from the genocide of the Holocaust.

See also 
 List of people who helped Jews during the Holocaust

References

External links 

 Popovici's testimony on the deportation:
 original Romanian 
 an incomplete English translation

20th-century Romanian lawyers
Mayors of places in Romania
Romanian military personnel of World War I
Romanian Righteous Among the Nations
Politicians from Chernivtsi
People from Suceava County
1892 births
1946 deaths
Eastern Orthodox Righteous Among the Nations
Chernivtsi University alumni